Saturday-Night Story was a British television programme which aired on the BBC from 1948 to 1953. In the series, a person would read a story. These people included Algernon Blackwood and John Slater. During 1948, the series was typically the last programme on the schedule for the day apart from a newsreel. It aired in a 15-minute time-slot. None of the episodes still exist, as the BBC very rarely telerecorded series at the time.

See also
The Lady from the Sea - Early surviving BBC telerecording
Telestory - Similar series (1961-1962, Australia)
Monodrama Theater - Somewhat similar series (1952-1953, United States)
Saturday Night Theatre - BBC radio drama programme

References

External links
Saturday-Night Story on IMDb

1948 British television series debuts
1953 British television series endings
BBC Television shows
1940s British anthology television series
1950s British anthology television series
Lost BBC episodes
1950s British television series
1940s British television series
British live television series
Black-and-white British television shows